The Colonial Estate (also known as the Tucker/Ivey House) is a historic site in Kissimmee, Florida. It is located at 2450 Old Dixie Highway. On January 3, 1994, it was added to the U.S. National Register of Historic Places.

This home was built c. 1916 by J. Wade Tucker, a lumber baron from Georgia. It was later purchased in the 1930s by Hilda and Lester Ivey and is still owned today by this family.

References

 Osceola County listings at Florida's Office of Cultural and Historical Programs
 Historic Places and Markers of Osceola County

 Osceola County at Florida Department of State - Division of Historical Resources

Houses on the National Register of Historic Places in Florida
Buildings and structures in Kissimmee, Florida
Houses in Osceola County, Florida
National Register of Historic Places in Osceola County, Florida
Houses completed in 1916
1916 establishments in Florida